Last of Our Kind is the fourth studio album by British hard rock band The Darkness. Produced by the band's guitarist Dan Hawkins at his studio The Hawks Nest in Norfolk, it was first released on 27 May 2015 in Japan, and later in other territories, by Canary Dwarf Records. The album is the first and only by the band to feature drummer Emily Dolan Davies, who replaced Ed Graham in 2014 before leaving less than a year later. The album also features Frankie Poullain on lead vocals for the first time on the final track Conquerors. The album was promoted via PledgeMusic, with the band offering signed copies of the album on both CD and vinyl, as well as signed guitars, handwritten lyric sheets and setlists from the band's archive.

Recording and production
Last of Our Kind was entirely written in Ireland, then produced by guitarist Dan Hawkins at his own recording studio at Leeders Farm, in Norfolk. Around fifteen songs were in contention for the final track listing; ten appear on the standard release, with the Japanese and Best Buy releases containing two exclusive bonus tracks, while another – "Million Dollar Strong" – was played live during their warm-up tour of Ireland in March 2015. A special edition of the album was also released in November 2015, containing four bonus tracks.

Release and promotion
The first song revealed from the album was Barbarian, which was released on 23 February at the same time as the album's official announcement. "Barbarian" was released as the first promotional single on 8 March 2015. A PledgeMusic page was set up to promote the album before release. The release of Last of Our Kind was preceded by a tour of Ireland in March 2015. The second promotional single from the album, "Open Fire", premiered on 23 March, followed by an official chart release on 25 May 2015. Following the departure of Emily Dolan Davies from the band, The Darkness performed live for the first time with current drummer Rufus Taylor, the son of Queen's Roger Taylor, at an album launch party, hosted for fans at London's Gibson Guitar Studio on April 23. A third single, "Last of Our Kind", was released on 29 July, accompanied by an in-studio promotional video, which features the band alongside a select number of fans. The album was re-released on 20 November 2015, with alternative, Christmas-themed cover and four bonus tracks including the singles "Million Dollar Strong" and "I Am Santa".

Critical reception
Journalist J.C. Maçek III of Spectrum Culture wrote "This fourth album was produced by guitarist Dan Hawkins who proves to be a genius with this style of music, especially when evoking the most primal wails of his brother, vocalist Justin Hawkins."

Music and lyrics
Frontman Justin Hawkins has described the album as "brutal", adding that "It's definitely stripped back with the exception of some mandolins. But when you're doing medieval rock, you should have a mandolin on it ... It's medieval rock, but it still sounds like The Darkness. It's medi-urban, I suppose". Explaining the meaning of the lyrics more deeply, the singer has noted that they "describe the Viking invasion of East Anglia which culminated in the decapitation of Edmund the Martyr", describing the thematic basis as "classic Darkness".

Track listing
All songs written and composed by Justin Hawkins, Dan Hawkins and Frankie Poullain; "Mudslide" and "Messenger" co-written by Emily Dolan Davies, "I Am Santa" co-written by Rufus Taylor.

Personnel

Justin Hawkins – vocals, guitar
Dan Hawkins – guitar, production
Frankie Poullain – bass, vocals ("Conquerors")
Emily Dolan Davies – drums
Rufus Tiger Taylor - drums ("I Am Santa")
Trevor Weston – monologue ("Barbarian")
236 The Darkness Fans – vocals ("Last of Our Kind")
Phillis Darkling – art direction, design
Nick Roche – artwork (front cover)
Christian Furr – artwork (rear cover)
Thom Lessner – artwork (illustrations)
Kevin Smith – online design
Simon Emmett – photography

Charts

References

2015 albums
The Darkness (band) albums